Volcan del Viento also called Gendarme Argentino 2 is a remote mountain in Argentina with an elevation of  metres. Volcan del Viento is within the following mountain ranges: Argentinean Andes, Puna de Atacama and Andean Volcaninc Belt (Central Part). It is located at the Argentinean province of Catamarca. Its slopes are entirely within the territory of the Argentinean city of Fiambalá.

First Ascent 
Volcan del Viento was first climbed by Claudio Bravo, Luis Salinas (Argentina) on January 12, 1988.

Elevation 
Other data from available digital elevation models: SRTM yields 6009 metres, ASTER 5987 metres, ASTER filled 6009 metres, ALOS 5987 metres, TanDEM-X 6049 metres. The height of the nearest key col is 5576 meters, leading to a topographic prominence of 452 meters. Volcan del Viento is considered a Mountain according to the Dominance System  and its dominance is 7.5%. Its parent peak is Ojos del Salado and the Topographic isolation is 11.3 kilometers.

References

External links 

 Elevation information about Volcan del Viento
 Weather Forecast at Volcan del Viento

Six-thousanders of the Andes
Mountains of Catamarca Province